The Kentucky National Guard comprises the:
Kentucky Army National Guard
Kentucky Air National Guard

See also
Kentucky Active Militia, the state defense force of Kentucky which replaced the Kentucky National Guard during World War I and World War II.

External links
Kentucky National Guard Homepage
Bibliography of Kentucky Army National Guard History compiled by the United States Army Center of Military History

National Guard
National Guard (United States)